This is a list of electoral results for the electoral district of Ovens in Victorian state elections.

Members for Ovens
One member initially, two from the increase in members of 1859.

Election results

Elections in the 1920s

 Alfred Billson was the sitting Nationalist MP for Ovens.

References

Victoria (Australia) state electoral results by district